

Nayak may refer to:

Ethnic groups
 Nayak caste, a caste found in India
 Nayak, another name for the Charodi (community) of Karnataka, India

Films

 Nayak (1966 film), a 1966 Bengali film directed by Satyajit Ray

 Nayak (2001 Assamese film), a 2001 Assamese film directed by Munin Barua

 Nayak: The Real Hero, a 2001 Hindi film starring Anil Kapoor and Rani Mukerji

People

 Bangaru Thirumalai Nayak, a member of the Madurai Nayak royal family
 Daya Nayak, Indian police inspector
 Ghanashyam Nayak, Indian film and television actor
 Jawahar Nayak, Indian politician
 Raghunatha Nayak, a king of the Nayaks of Tanjore
 Sevappa Nayak, first ruler of the Nayaks of Tanjore
 Thirumalai Nayak, a king of the Madurai Nayak Dynasty
 Varunakulattan, also known as Khem Nayak, 17th-century feudal lord of the Jaffna Kingdom
 Viswanatha Nayak, founder of Madurai Nayak Dynasty

Other uses
 Naik (military rank), also spelt Nayak, a rank in the Indian and Pakistan armies

 Any of the Nayak dynasties, that arose from the fragmentation of the Vijayanagara Empire in South India
 Nayak (title), a title used across India

See also 

 Naayak, a 2013 Telugu film directed by V. V. Vinayak

 Neyak (disambiguation)

 Nyack (disambiguation)